Nemacheilus rueppelli, also known as the mongoose loach is a species of stone loach from rivers in India. It includes Nemachilichthys shimogensis, which frequently is recognized as a valid species from the Thunga River in Karnataka, but Keskar et al. 2015 treat them as synonyms, while Fishbase says the name is misapplied and should not be used as N. shimgoensis is treated as a separate species by Fishbase and the IUCN. According to Keskar et al, 2015 this species is placed in the monotypic genus Nemachilichthys but Fishbase retains it in Nemacheilus., although Catalog of Fishes follows treatment outlined by Keskar et al.

References

rueppelli
Cyprinid fish of Asia
Endemic fauna of India
Freshwater fish of India
Taxa named by William Henry Sykes
Fish described in 1839